Rama Lake can be:

 Rama Lake (Pakistan)
 Rama Lake (Bosnia and Herzegovina)